This is a list of Native American firsts. Native American people were the first people to live in the area that is now known as the United States. This is a chronological list of the first accomplishments that Native Americans have achieved both through their tribal identities and also through the culture of the United States over time. It includes individuals and groups of people who are indigenous to contemporary United States. This includes Native Americans in the United States, which includes American Indians, Alaska Natives, and Native  Hawaiians.

{|id="toc" class="toc" summary="Contents"
! 
●        ●

\___/
| |
16th century: 1500s-1540s • 1550s-1590s
17th century: 
1600s-1650s • 1660s-1690s

18th century: 1700s–1750s • 1750s–1790s• 
19th century: 1800s • 1810s • 1820s • 1830s • 1840s • 1850s • 1860s • 1870s • 1880s • 1890s
20th century: 1900s • 1910s • 1920s • 1930s • 1940s • 1950s • 1960s • 1970s • 1980s • 1990s
21st century: 2000s • 2010s • 2020s
See also  • References • External links

|

16th century

1530s 
1539

 Indigenous peoples of Florida have first contact with the Hernando de Soto Expedition, marking first contact with Spaniards and African people for many Indigenous peoples of the Southeastern Woodlands.

1580s 
1581

 The Navajo make first contact with the Spanish.

1587
 First recorded Protestant christianing of a Native American: Christening of Manteo (Croatan).

1610 
1615

 First Native American received as royalty by English royalty: Pocahontas (Powhatan).

17th century

1610s 
1615

 The Huron people first act as middlemen for French traders and other Native American tribes.

1620s 

 First Native American in New England to meet with settlers leading to ratify a peace treaty: Massaoit (Wampanoag).

1630s 
1638

 First American Indian reservation established: Quinnipiac Nation.

1660s 

1663

 First published writing by a Native American in the Americas: Honoratissimi Benefactores by Caleb Cheeshahteaumuck (Wampanoag).
 First Bible published in the Americas: The Eliot Indian Bible is printed in Natick and one of the translators, James Printer (Nipmuc) became the first Native American to use a printing press.

1665

 First Native American graduate of Harvard University: Caleb Cheeshahteaumuck (Wampanoag).

1670s 
1670

 First Native American ordained as a Christian clergy member: Hiacoomes (Wampanoag).
1672

 Native Americans served as first mail couriers between New York City and Albany.

18th century

1760s 
1765

 First Native American recorded as preaching Christianity to a non-Native audience: Samson Occom (Mohegan).

1770s 
1772

 First published literary work by a Native American: A Sermon Preached at the Execution of Moses Paul, an Indian by Samson Occom (Mohegan).

1790s 
1794

 First Native American published, written report of other Native American peoples in the English language: A Short Narration of My Last Journey to the Western Country by Hendrick Aupaumut (Mohican).

19th century

1810s 
1812

 First Native American commissioned brigadier general in the United States Army: William McIntosh (Muscogee).

1820s 
1821
 Cherokee syllabary is first adopted by the Cherokee Nation general council: created by Sequoyah (Cherokee, ca. 1770–1843)

1822
 First Native American admitted to West Point and first Native American graduate: David Moniac (Muscogee).
1825

 First Iroquois person to create a written account of the oral histories of the Haudenosaunee: David Cusick (Tuscarora) in Sketches of the Ancient History of the Six Nations.

1827

 The Cherokee Nation adopts its first modern constitution.

1828

 First Native American newspaper and first newspaper published in an Indigenous language: The Cherokee Phoenix. First editor of the paper was Buck Watie (Cherokee).

1829

 First full-length autobiography published by a Native American: A Son of the Forest by William Apess (Pequot).
 First book published using the Cherokee syllabary: Cherokee Hymn Book printed by Elias Boudinot (Cherokee) and a New England missionary.

1840s 

1844

 First known Native American person to earn a Western medical degree from Western college: Wa-o-wa-wa-na-onk (Cayuga).

1847

 First full-length travelog by a Native American: The Life, History, and Travels of Kah-ge-ga-gah-bowh by George Copway (Ojibwe).

1850s 
1854

 First novel published by a Native American: The Life and Adventures of Joaquin Murietta by John Rollin Ridge (Cherokee).
 First Native American student periodical publication, A Wreath of Cherokee Rose Buds.

1856

 First governor of the Chickasaw Nation after the adoption of the new constitution: Cyrus Harris (Chickasaw).
 First Native American ordained as a Roman Catholic priest: James Bouchard (Lenape).
1857

 First Native American editor of non-native publication: John Rollin Ridge (Cherokee) who was the founding editor of the Sacramento Bee.

1860s 
1861

 First Native American professional track athlete: Louis "Deerfoot" Bennett (Seneca).

1865

 First person to ride the Chisholm Trail: Jesse Chisholm (Cherokee).
1867

 First Native American to earn the rank of brigadier general in the U.S. Army: Ely Samuel Parker (Seneca).

1869

 First Native American to be awarded the Medal of Honor: Co-Rux-Te-Chod-Ish (Pawnee).
 First Native American to work as the Commissioner for Indian Affairs: Ely Samuel Parker (Seneca).

1870s 
1870

 First Native American elected as a United States Senator: Hiram Rhodes Revels (Lumbee).

1875

 First independent Cherokee-owned newspaper published: The Indian Progress and owned by Elias C. Boudinot (Cherokee).
1878

 First Choctaw tribal newspaper: The Choctaw News.
1879

 First Native American declared "a person within the meaning of the law" in the United States: Standing Bear (Ponca).

1880s 
1881

 First Native American anthropologist: Francis La Flesche (Omaha).

1883

 First Native American woman to publish a book, Sarah Winnemucca (Northern Paiute), who published Life Among the Piutes: Their Wrongs and Claims.
1886

 First privately owned Chippewa periodical: The Progress founded by Theodore H. Beaulieu and Gustave Beaulieu (Chippewa/Ojibwe).

1889

 First Native American woman to earn a Western medical degree from a Western college: Susan La Flesche (Omaha).
 First documented Native American U.S. Army nurses: Susan Bordeaux, Ella Clark, Anna B. Pleets, Josephine Two Bears (all Lakota).

1890s 
1891

 First novel published by a Native American woman: Wynema: A Child of the Forest by Sophia Alice Callahan (Muscogee).

1892

 First Native American elected to the United States House of Representatives: Charles D. Curtis (Kaw/Osage/Potawatomi).
1893

 First independent periodical published by and for the Osage people: The Wah-sha-she founded by George E. Tinker (Osage).
 First Native American woman to publish and edit a newspaper: Norma E. Standley Smiser (Choctaw).
1897

 First Native American to play on a major league baseball team: Louis Sockalexis (Penobscot).
1898

 First Native American to graduate from Stanford University: John Milton Oskison (Cherokee).

20th century

1900s 
1903

 First tribal newspaper published by the White Earth Ojibwe: The Tomahawk.

1908

 First tribal newspaper published for the Quileute people: The Quileute Independent created by Webster Hudson (Quileute).
First paniolos to win at the Frontier Days rodeo competition: Ikua Purdy (Native Hawaiian), Archie Ka'au'a (Native Hawaiian), and Jack Low (Native Hawaiian).
1909

 First Native American film actor: James Young Deer (Nanticoke, 1876–1946).
First Native American lawyer to argue a case before the Supreme Court: Lyda Conley (Wyandot).

1910s 
1910

 First Native American to graduate from Yale: Henry Roe Cloud (Ho-Chunk).

1911

 First Native American to play in the NFL: Jim Thorpe (Sac & Fox Nation).
1912

 First Native American to win gold medals for the United States in the Olympic Games: Jim Thorpe (Sac & Fox Nation).
 First American to win an Olympic medal (silver) in the 10,000 meter run: Lewis Tewanima (Hopi).

1913

 First Native American to attend the United States Naval Academy: Joseph J. Clark (Cherokee).
 First person documented as having reached the summit of Denali: Walter Harper (Athabascan).
 First Native American head coach of a college sports team: Albert Andrew Exendine (Delaware Tribe).
1916

 First American Indian Day celebrated in May 1916. The day was created by Red Fox James (Blackfeet Tribe).

1918

 First known use of Indigenous Code Talkers as part of a U.S. military effort: Choctaw, Cherokee, and Navajo were all Code Talkers in World War I.

1920s 
1921

 First all-Native American National Guard: Haskell unit of the Kansas National Guard.
 First Native American woman pilot: Bessie Coleman (Cherokee heritage).

1922

 First Native American student to take part in a world conference: Ruth Muskrat Bronson (Cherokee).
 First woman to serve as chief of the Seminole tribe: Alice Brown Davis (Seminole).
1923

 First chair of the Navajo Tribal Council: Henry Chee Dodge (Navajo).
1924

 First Navajo person to earn a law degree: Thomas Henry Dodge (Navajo).
 First all-Native American cavalry created in the United States: Troop C, 114th Cavalry.
 First Native American to captain the United States Hockey Team: Clarence Able (Chippewa).
 First Native American woman elected to a state legislature: Cora Belle Reynolds Anderson (Chippewa).
 First Alaska Native elected to the Alaskan Territorial Legislature: William L. Paul (Tlingit).
 First Native American to carry the United States flag at the opening ceremony of the Olympic Games: Clarence "Taffy" Abel (Chippewa).

1926
 First Native American in the NHL New York Rangers November 16, 1926: Clarence "Taffy" Abel (Chippewa).
 First Native American woman to hold state office in Oklahoma: Jessie Elizabeth Randolph Moore (Chickasaw).
 First national reform group with only Native American membership: National Congress of American Indians (NCAI) by Zitkala-Sa (Yankton Dakota) and Raymond Bonnin (Yankton Dakota).

1927

 First Native American to earn a degree as a registered nurse: Susie Walking Bear Yellowtail (Crow).

1929

 First Native American to serve as Vice President of the United States: Charles D. Curtis (Kaw/Osage/Potawatomi).

1930s 
1930

 First accredited nursing program for Native Americans: Sage Memorial Hospital School of Nursing.
 First enrolled Native American woman to earn a pilot's license: Mary Riddle (Clatsop/Quinault).

1932

 First Native American woman elected to the Montana State Legislature: Dolly Smith Akers (Assiniboine).
 First Native American to open the Olympic Games: Charles D. Curtis (Kaw/Osage/Potawatomi).

1935

 First Native American woman elected as president of the General Federation of Women's Clubs: Roberta Campbell Lawson (Delaware Tribe).
1939

 First Native American to win national and international level boxing championships: Chester L. Ellis (Seneca).

1940s 
1941

 First Native American commissioned in the American Chaplain Corps: James C. Ottipoby (Comanche).
 First Native American Miss America contestant: Mifauny Shunatona, Miss Oklahoma

1942

 First Native American to become a major general in the U.S. Air Force: Clarence L. Tinker (Osage).
 First American to dance with the Paris Opera and receive the title of prima ballerina: Maria Tallchief (Osage).
 First Native American woman to work for Lockheed, and probably first Native American woman aeronautical engineer: Mary Golda Ross (Cherokee Nation).
 First Native American commissioned pilot in the United States Navy: Tom Oxendine (Lumbee).

1943

 First Navajo language newspaper: Adahooniligii.
 First Native American venerated as a saint by the Roman Catholic church: Kateri Tekakwitha (Mohawk).
 First Native American woman joins the Marine Corps Women's Reserve: Minnie Spotted-Wolf (Blackfoot).
1944

 First Muscogee person to earn the  Medal of Honor: Ernest Childers (Muscogee (Creek) Nation). 
 First person of Choctaw descent to earn the Medal of Honor: Van T. Barfoot (Mississippi Choctaw descent).
 First and only Native American WASP: Ola Mildred Rexroat (Oglala Lakota).
1945

 First Cherokee to earn the Medal of Honor: Jack Montgomery (Cherokee Nation).
First anti-discrimination law passed in the United States: The Alaska Equal Rights Act of 1945, ending segregation of Alaska Natives.
1946

 First female elected Tribal Chair in the United States: Josephine Gates Kelly (Standing Rock Sioux)

1949

 First Hopi to earn the Indian Achievement Award from the Indian Council Fire: Fred Kabotie.

1950s 

1950

 First Native American veterinarian: Bernard Anthony Hoehner (Standing Rock Sioux).
1952

 First Hawaiian to be awarded the Medal of Honor: Herbert Kaili Pililaau (Native Hawaiian).
1953

 First Indian Miss America: Arlene Wesley James (Yakama).

1956

 First Native American to earn Western dentistry degree: George Blue Spruce (Laguna).
 First Native American oncologist: James W. Hampton (Chickasaw/Choctaw).

1957
 First Native American elected to the Idaho State Legislature: Joseph R. Garry (Coeur d'Alene).
 First radio station to primarily broadcast in Navajo language: KNDN-AM.
1958

 First Native American to graduate from the United States Air Force Academy: Leo Johnson (unknown tribal affiliation).
1959

 First woman president of the Mescalero Apache Tribe: Virginia S. Klinekole (Mescalero Apache).

1960s 

 First Native American pharmacist: Francis Quam (Zuni).

1960

 First Native American to own an FTD floral shop: Nunny Waano-Gano (Karuk).
1961

 First Native American elected to the U.S. Congress from South Dakota: Benjamin Reifel (Lakota).
1962

 First Alaska Native newspaper: The Tundra Times with Howard Rock (Inupiaq) as the first editor.

1963

 First Native American to receive the Presidential Medal of Freedom: Annie Dodge Wauneka (Navajo).
1964

 First Native American elected to the New Mexico House of Representatives: James D. Atcitty (Navajo).
 First Native American on the United States Olympic Judo Team: Benjamin Nighthorse Campbell (Northern Cheyenne).
 First Native American to win an Olympic gold medal in the 10,000 meter run: William Mervin "Billy" Mills (Oglala Lakota).
 First Native American to earn a doctorate in psychology: Marigold Linton, from UCLA (Morongo Band of Mission Indians)

1966

 First Native American elected as New Mexico state senator: Tom Lee (Navajo).
 First Native American elected to the Arizona House of Representatives: Lloyd Lynn House (Navajo/Oneida).
 First Native American man to earn a doctorate in psychology: Arthur McDonald (Oglala Lakota).
1967

 First ballet written specifically for Native American dancers: Four Moons which was scored by Louis Ballard (Quapaw/Cherokee).
 First woman to chair the Seminole Tribe Council: Betty Mae Tiger Jumper (Seminole Tribe of Florida).

1969

 First Native American to receive a Pulitzer Prize: N. Scott Momaday (Kiowa).
 First Native American to become a public school district superintendent: Henry Gatewood (Navajo).
 First Native American to work as Indian Commissioner on the Indian Claims Commission: Brantley Blue (Lumbee).

1970s 
1970

 First broadcast license given to a Native American tribe (Choctaw): WYRU-AM.

1971

 First Native American job corps center founded: The Kicking Horse Regional Manpower Center.
 First Native American elected to the North Dakota state legislature: Arthur Raymond (Dakota Sioux/Oglala).
 First Navajo to earn a doctorate in physics: Fred Begay (Navajo).

1972

 First Native American owned and operated non-commercial radio station for Native American listeners: KTDB-FM.
 First Native American on the United States Women's Table Tennis National Team: Angelita Rosal (Sioux).
 First non-Japanese sumo wrestler to win the top division championship: Takamiyama Daigorō (Native Hawaiian).
 First induction ceremony of the American Indian Athletic Hall of Fame.

1974
 First Alaska Native to win the Iditarod Trail Sled Dog Race: Carl Huntington (Athabascan).
 First Native American band to reach the top five on the Billboard Hot 100: Redbone with "Come and Get Your Love" at number 5.

1975

 First artist chosen by the Museum of the American Indian for a series on modern Native American art: R. C. Gorman (Navajo).
 First Native American practitioner of an Indigenous religion to give the invocation at the United States Senate:  Frank Fools Crow (Lakota).
 First Native American woman dentist: Jessica Rickert (Prairie Band Potawatomi Nation).
 First woman to chair the Yavapai-Apache Tribe: Vera Brown Starr (Yavapai-Apache).
 First tribally owned and built golf course is opened by the Mescalero Apache Tribe.
1976

 First American Indian Studies master's degree program established by Charlotte Anne Wilson Heth (Cherokee).
 First Jicarilla Apache woman to earn a doctorate degree: Veronica Velarde Tiller.
 First radio station broadcasting in the Navajo language and under Navajo control: The Navajo Radio Network.
 First chairperson of the Fort Sill Apache Tribe: Mildred Cleghorn (Fort Sill Apache).
 First Alaska Native to become a physician: Ted Mala (Inupiaq).
1977

 First Inuit Circumpoloar Conference takes place.

1978

 First Native American artist to display their work in China: Joan Hill (Muscogee).
 First woman to serve as chair of the Cheyenne-Arapaho Tribes: Juanita L. Learned (Cheyenne-Arapaho).
 First person of Native American descent to earn a fellowship from the National Institute of Mental Health and the American Psychiatric Association: Catharine Gail Kincaid (Eastern Dakota descent).

1980s 

1980

 First Native American woman nominated for Vice President of the United States in any political party: LaDonna Harris (Comanche).
 First Native American woman to head the Southwestern Association for Indian Arts (SWAIA): Ramona Sakiestewa (Hopi)

1981

 First Native American woman to graduate from the United States Naval Academy: Sandra L. Hinds (unknown tribal affiliation).
 First American to direct the Paris Opera ballet: Rosella Hightower (Choctaw Nation).

1982

 First Native American elected to the Colorado House of Representatives: Benjamin Nighthorse Campbell (Northern Cheyenne).
 First Native American woman to graduate from the United States Air Force Academy: Dolores K. Smith (Cherokee).
 First Native American director of Indian Health Services (IHS): Everett R. Rhoades (Kiowa).
 First tribe to open an electric plant: Warm Spring Indians in Oregon.

1983

 First woman to work as attorney general for the Navajo Nation: Claudeen Bates Arthur (Navajo).
 First Native American woman to argue a successful case before the Supreme Court of the United States: Arlinda Locklear (Lumbee).
 First anthology of Native American women's art and literature is published: A Gathering of Spirit: A Collection by North American Women edited by Beth Brant (Mohawk).
 First television documentary produced by a crew of all-Indigenous people: I'd Rather Be Powwowing, directed by Larry Littlebird (Kewa Pueblo).
 First Minnesota Ojibwe Nation woman to become a Western medical doctor: Kathleen Annette (White Earth Ojibwe).

1984

 First Alaska Native woman to earn a doctorate degree: Elizabeth Anne Parent (Athabascan).
 First Native American woman to graduate from West Point: Brigitte T. Wahwassuck (unknown tribal affiliation).

1985

 First woman to become a Cherokee Nation principal chief: Wilma Mankiller (Cherokee Nation).
 First Native American to receive the Anisfield-Wolf Book Award for race relations: Clifford Bahniptewa (Hopi).
1986

 First Native American ordained as Roman Catholic bishop: Donald E. Pelotte (Abenaki).
 First public recognition of the military service of the Choctaw code talkers.
 First American Indian Week celebrated during the week of November 23–30.

1987

 First Native American to become a fellow of the MacArthur Foundation: Leslie Marmon Silko (Laguna Pueblo).
 First Native American woman named as Ms. magazine's Woman of the Year: Wilma Mankiller (Cherokee Nation).
 First community-owned and operated clinic established on an Indian reservation: Porcupine Clinic by Loralei DeCora (Winnebago).
 First woman to elected as governor of the Isleta Pueblo: Verna Williamson (Isleta Pueblo).
 First woman in the Eastern Band of Cherokee to become a Western physician: Frances Owl-Smith (Cherokee).
1988

 First woman elected as tribal chair of the Turtle Mountain  Band of Chippewa: Twila Martin-Kehahbah (Chippewa-Cree).
 First Tuscarora Indian woman to become a Western surgeon: Susan Veronica Karol (Tuscarora Indian Nation of Sanborn).

1989

 First book of poetry in Navajo is published by Rex Lee Jim (Navajo).
 First Native American news reporter on national television: Hattie Kauffman (Nez Percé).
 First Native American in Nevada to become a Western physician: Sharon M. Malotte (Shoshone).

1990s 
1990

 First Native American to win in a World Chess Championship open: Jason Stevens (Navajo).
 First Native American Month celebrated in November.

1991

 First Native American to receive the Freeman Tilden Award from the National Park Service and the National Parks and Conservation Association: Wilson Hunter (Navajo).
 First Native American state attorney general: Larry Echo Hawk (Pawnee).
1993

 First play-by-play of an NBA game in a Native language is broadcast in Navajo.

1994

 First Native American to work as U.S. Marshall in the Justice Department: Robert D. Ecoffey (Oglala Lakota Sioux).
 First Navajo woman board certified in surgery: Lori Arviso Alvord (Navajo).

1995

 First Native American artwork travels in space: Don Montileaux's (Lakota) painting is on board the Endeavor.
 First woman to serve as principal chief of the Eastern Band of Cherokee Indians: Joyce Dugan (Cherokee).
 First Native American woman to play professional basketball for a foreign nation: Ryneldi Becenti (Navajo).
1996

 First Native American woman elected to the New Mexico House of Representatives: Lynda Morgan Lovejoy (Navajo).
 First Native American participant in the Paralympics: Cheri Madsen (Omaha).

1997

 First Native American women elected to the Arizona House of Representatives: Sally Ann Gonzales (Yaqui) and Debora Norris (Navajo).
 First Native American to be awarded the Award for Excellence from the American Public Health Association: Linda Burhansstipanov (Cherokee).
 First Native American Roman Catholic archbishop: Charles J. Chaput (Prairie Band Potawatomi)
1998

 First national awards for Native American music: Native American Music Awards (NAMA).
 First literary and artistic journal for Native Hawaiians: 'Ōiwi: A Native Hawaiian Journal founded by D. Mahealani Dudoit (Native Hawaiian).
1999

 First Navajo to earn a doctorate in history: Jennifer Denetdale (Navajo).

21st century

2000s 

2000

 First Native American president of the American Public Health Association: Michael E. Bird (Kewa Pueblo/Ohkay Owingeh).
 First Native American woman to graduate from Yale University School of Medicine: Patricia Nez Henderson (Navajo).
2001

 First Native Hawaiian drafted by Major League Soccer: Brian Ching (Native Hawaiian).
 First Native American to compete in the Indy 500: Cory Witherill (Navajo).

2002

 First Native American in space: John Herrington (Chickasaw Nation).
 First Native American woman to compete in the Winter Olympics: Naomi Lang (Karuk).
2003

 First tribe to own a professional sports team: The Mohegan Tribe purchases the Connecticut Sun.
 First Native American woman killed in combat fighting for the United States in war in Asia: Lori Piestewa (Hopi).

2004

 First woman to serve as president of the tribal council for the Pine Ridge Indian Reservation: Cecelia Fire Thunder (Oglala Lakota).
 First woman tribal chair of the White Earth Ojibwe: Erma Vizenor (Ojibwe).
 First Native American museum established on the Nationa Mall: National Museum of the American Indian.

2005

 First tribe to purchase a professional men's basketball team: The Yakima Nation buys the Yakima SunKings.

2006

 First woman to serve as chief of the Eastern Shawnee Tribe of Oklahoma: Glenna Wallace (Shawnee).
 First awards announced in the American Indian Youth Literature Awards.

2007

 First Native American president of the American Library Association: Loriene Roy (White Earth Ojibwe).

2008

 First Native American woman elected to a statewide executive office: Denise Juneau (Mandan, Hidatsa, and Arikara Nation).
 First Native American to win the Heisman Trophy: Sam Bradford (Cherokee Nation).

2010s 
2010

 First woman to become a chief of the Delaware Tribe of Indians: Paula Pechonick (Delaware).
 First Native American nominated for the United States Poet Laureate: Linda Hogan (Chickasaw).

2011

 First Native American drafted into the WNBA: Tahnee Robinson (Northern Cheyenne).
 First woman chief of the Mississippi Band of Choctaw Indians: Phyliss J. Anderson (Choctaw).
2014

 First Native American named a United States Ambassador to the United Nations: Keith Harper (Cherokee Nation).
 First Native American woman to become a federal judge in the United States: Diane Humetewa (Hopi).
2015

 First Native American-owned cannabis shop: Elevation, opened by the Squaxin Island Tribe.
2016

 First Native American to receive an electoral vote for President of the United States: Faith Spotted Eagle (Yankton Sioux Tribe)
  First Native American woman to receive an electoral vote for Vice President of the United States: Winona LaDuke (White Earth Ojibwe)
2017

 First Native-American to serve in the Wyoming State Senate: Affie Ellis (Navajo).

2018

 First Native American women elected to the United States Congress: Sharice Davids (Ho-Chunk) and Deb Haaland (Laguna Pueblo).
 First Native American to serve as a law clerk for the Supreme Court of the United States: Tobi Merrit Edwards Young (Chickasaw Nation).

2019

 First Native American to earn an honorary award from the Academy Awards: Wes Studi (Cherokee Nation).
 First Native American United States Poet Laureate: Joy Harjo (Mvskoke/Cherokee).
 First delegate to the United States House of Representatives from the Cherokee Nation: Kimberly Teehee (Cherokee Nation).
 First American nationally distributed children's show to feature an Alaska Native as the lead character: Molly of Denali, premiered in 2019.

2020s 
2020
 First painting on canvas by a Native American artist in the National Gallery of Art: I See Red: Target, by Jaune Quick-to-See Smith (Confederated Salish and Kootenai Tribes). 
 First Native American to compete in the Tour de France: Neilson Powless (Oneida).
 First U.S. tribe to contribute heirloom seeds to the Svalbard Global Seed Vault: the Cherokee Nation.
 First Native American openly transgender person elected to office in America: Stephanie Byers, elected to the Kansas state House of Representatives (Chickasaw Nation).
First Alaska Native to be featured on United States currency: Elizabeth Peratrovich (Tlingit).
First Native American to play for the National Women's Soccer League: Madison Hammond  (Navajo and San Felipe Pueblo).

2021
 First Native American to win a Caldecott Medal: Michaela Goade for We Are Water Protectors (Tlingit and Haida tribes).	
 First Native American to serve as a US Cabinet secretary (Secretary of the Interior): Deb Haaland (Laguna Pueblo).

2022
 First Native American to win the Pulitzer Prize for Music: Raven Chacon (Navajo).
 First Native American woman to win a medal at the World Athletics Championships: Janee' Kassanavoid (Comanche).
 First Native American Treasurer of the United States: Marilynn Malerba (Mohegan).
 First Native American woman in space: Nicole Aunapu Mann (of Wailacki heritage, an enrolled member of the Round Valley Indian Tribes).
 First Native American elected to the position of bishop in the United Methodist Church: David Wilson (Choctaw).

2023
 First Native American woman to go on a spacewalk: Nicole Aunapu Mann (of Wailacki heritage, an enrolled member of the Round Valley Indian Tribes).

See also 

 Native Americans in the United States
 List of African American firsts
 List of Asian American firsts

References

Sources

External links 
 American Indian History Timeline

American culture
Indigenous peoples in the United States
Lists of firsts
Native American history
Native American topics
Native American-related lists
Social history of the United States